Alkalibacterium iburiense is a Gram-positive, obligately alkaliphilic, indigo-reducing, facultatively anaerobic and straight rod-shaped bacterium from the genus Alkalibacterium.

References

Lactobacillales
Bacteria described in 2005